Periklís Iakovákis (born 24 March 1979 in Patras) is a retired Greek athlete mainly competing in 400 metres hurdles. He is the Greek record holder with a time of 47.82 seconds and fifteen times national champion in the event.

He has competed at four Summer Olympics (2000, 2004, 2008 and 2012) and is a six-time participant at the World Championships in Athletics. He was the world bronze medalist in 2003 and the European champion in 2006. His first major win came at the 1998 World Junior Championships and he won the gold medal at the 2001 Mediterranean Games. He was named the 2003 and 2006 Greek Male Athlete of the Year.

Career
In 1998 Iakovakis won the gold medal at the World Junior Championships in Annecy, France with 49.82 seconds, and five years later he won the bronze medal at the 2003 World Championships in Athletics in Paris-Saint-Denis, France. In the final at the Stade de France, he finished in 48.24 seconds after Félix Sánchez and Joey Woody.

Iakovakis achieved his personal best of 47.82 seconds on 6 May 2006 in Osaka during the IAAF World Athletics Tour and won his first major competition 3 months later. He became European Champion in Gothenborg, Sweden finishing at 48.46 seconds in the final.

After his win at the European Championships, Iakovakis won the full-lap hurdles event in 47.92 seconds at the Zurich Weltklasse Golden League meet at the last evening that this top meeting would be held at the Letzigrund. The reigning European Champion was then first at the Herculis IAAF World Athletics Tour meeting in Monaco.

He won the bronze medal at the 2009 IAAF World Athletics Final, which was the last edition of the competition and was held in Thessaloniki.

In 2010 he set a season target of defending his European title. He suffered a minor injury to his soleus muscle in March, but recovered and began his preparation in South Africa and Cyprus. He identified Dai Greene (the eventual winner) as his main European rival in the event. Finally he did not succeed in his goal, as he finished in the fifth place in the 2010 European final, having run in the tight first lane. He was slower in the 2011 season and, for the first time since 1998, his fastest run that year was over 50 seconds. He missed a seventh consecutive appearance at the World Championships, but did compete for Greece in the First League of the 2011 European Team Championships, where he won the 400 m hurdles race. He marked a resurgence in form at the 2012 Greek Championships by winning his 15th straight national title, including a run of 49.04 seconds in the heats.

Maria Sotirakopoulou has been his coach for many years.

Honours

References

External links
 

1979 births
Living people
Athletes from Patras
Sportspeople from Trikala
Greek male hurdlers
Olympic athletes of Greece
Athletes (track and field) at the 2000 Summer Olympics
Athletes (track and field) at the 2004 Summer Olympics
Athletes (track and field) at the 2008 Summer Olympics
Athletes (track and field) at the 2012 Summer Olympics
Mediterranean Games gold medalists for Greece
Mediterranean Games bronze medalists for Greece
Athletes (track and field) at the 2001 Mediterranean Games
Athletes (track and field) at the 2013 Mediterranean Games
World Athletics Championships athletes for Greece
World Athletics Championships medalists
Greek European Athletics champions (track and field)
Mediterranean Games medalists in athletics
Greek male sprinters